The 2018 Pan American Men's Handball Championship was the 18th official competition for senior men's national handball teams of North, Central and South America and the Caribbean. It was held from 16 to 24 June 2018 in Nuuk, Greenland. It also acted as the qualifying competition for the 2019 World Men's Handball Championship in Denmark and Germany, securing three vacancies for the World Championship.

Argentina won the tournament for the seventh time after defeating Brazil 29–24 in the final.

Venue

Qualification

Cuba withdrew before the tournament.

Draw
The draw was held on 14 April 2018 at Buenos Aires, Argentina.

Seeding

Preliminary round
All times are local (UTC−2).

Group A

Group B

Knockout stage

Bracket

5th place bracket

Ninth place game

5–8th place semifinals

Semifinals

Seventh place game

Fifth place game

Third place game

Final

Final ranking

Awards
All-star team
Best player:  Henrique Teixeira
Goalkeeper:  Isak Olsen
Right Wing:  Fábio Chiuffa
Right Back:  José Toledo
Playmaker:  Sebastián Simonet
Left Back:  Thiagus dos Santos
Left Wing:  Federico Fernández
Pivot:  Esteban Salinas

References

External links
Official website
Pan Am Nuuk 2018 website of KNR
Panamhandball
Results at todor66

2018 Men
Pan American Men's Handball Championship
Pan American Men's Handball Championship
H
Sport in Nuuk
June 2018 sports events in North America